Plecia avus is an extinct species of Plecia in the March fly family Bibionidae and is solely known from Early Eocene sediments exposed in central southern British Columbia.  The species is one of twenty bibionid species described from the Eocene Okanagan Highlands.

History & classification 
The holotype fossil of Plecia avus was collected by Lawrence Lambe from outcrops of the Allenby Formation along the Tulameen River on 6 August 1906, and then subsequently described by Anton Handlirsch in 1910.  The type description was published in his Canadian fossil Insects. 5. Insects from the Tertiary lake deposits of the southern interior of British Columbia, along with a series of 19 other bibionid species.  Handlirsch did not include the etymological derivation of species names in the volume.

While reviewing the tertiary fossil bibionids of the Eocene Okanagan Highlands, Rice (1959) transferred almost all of the species described by Handlirsch from the genus Penthetria to Plecia based on the angles of the R3+4 vein, which were deemed closer to that of modern Plecia species than that of Penthetria. This decision resulted in the species move from Penthetria avus to Plecia avus and an additional 7 fossils were identified and designated hypotypes of Pl. avus during study of the Geological Survey of Canada collections.   Rice additionally noted the close similarity in wing morphology to the species Plecia canadensis, Plecia dilatata, Plecia pictipennis, and Plecia transitoria.  Based on the larger specimen set in the re-description, he mused on the possibility they might intergrade enough to be a single species rather than multiple species.

Distribution 
Plecia avus has been recovered from up to four locations in the Okanagan highlands, with the holotype, GSC No. 7265,  type locality being on the Tulameen River "opposite Vermilion Cliff" in the Allenby Formation near Princeton, British Columbia. H. M. Rice (1959) subsequently identified four additional fossils from the Driftwood Shales near Smithers and another from Tranquille Creek near Cache Creek.

Description 

The costal edge of the wing is only distinctly curved and most specimens show an indentation along the wing edge when the subcostal vein terminates. In specimens where the wing apex is known the acute wing tip symmetrical. The R3+4 fork of the radial vein is of moderate long in length and only narrowly diverges from the R5.

Paleoecology 
The Okanagan Highland sites represent upland lake systems that were surrounded by a warm temperate ecosystem with nearby volcanism. The highlands likely had a mesic upper microthermal to lower mesothermal climate, in which winter temperatures rarely dropped low enough for snow, and which were seasonably equitable. The Okanagan Highlands paleoforest surrounding the lakes have been described as precursors to the modern temperate broadleaf and mixed forests of Eastern North America and Eastern Asia. Based on the paleofloral and paleofaunal biotas, the lakes were higher and cooler than the coeval coastal forests preserved in the Puget Group and Chuckanut Formation of Western Washington, which are described as lowland tropical forest ecosystems. Estimates of the paleoelevation range between  higher than the coastal forests.

Estimates of the mean annual temperature have been derived from climate leaf analysis multivariate program (CLAMP) analysis and leaf margin analysis (LMA) the Princeton paleoflora.

References

External links 
 

Bibionidae
Eocene insects of North America
Prehistoric Diptera genera
Allenby Formation
Coldwater Beds
Driftwood Shales
Horsefly Shales
Tranquille Formation
Taxa named by Anton Handlirsch
Fossil taxa described in 1910